Bill Seman is a former Grey Cup champion guard in the Canadian Football League.

A Truman Bulldogs, Seman played one season (5 games) with the Hamilton Tiger-Cats, part of the Grey Cup winning team in 1967. He was selected to the Truman State University all century football team in 2000.

References

Hamilton Tiger-Cats players
Truman Bulldogs football players
Truman State University alumni
Living people
1940s births
Year of birth uncertain